Internally displaced persons in the United States are people from the Gulf States region in the southern United States, most notably New Orleans, Louisiana, who were forced to leave their homes because of the devastation brought on by Hurricane Katrina in 2005 and were unable to return because of a multitude of factors, and are collectively known as the Gulf Coast diaspora and by standard definition considered IDPs. At their peak, hurricane evacuee shelters housed 273,000 people and, later, FEMA trailers housed at least 114,000 households. Even a decade after Hurricane Katrina, many victims who were forced to relocate were still unable to return home.

In 2005, around 1,500,000 people from Alabama, Mississippi and Louisiana were forced to leave their homes due to Hurricane Katrina. Around 40% of evacuees, mostly people from Louisiana, were not able to return home. 25% of evacuees relocated within 10 miles of their previous county. 25% of evacuees relocated at least 450 miles away. 10% of evacuees relocated  at least 830 miles away. "Returning home can be an important step for the health and economic stability of low-income, climate-displaced families. Evidence indicates that the climate displaced, particularly those who are low income, can suffer from greater hardships than they did prior to evacuation."

The population of New Orleans fell from 484,674 before Katrina (April 2000) to an estimated 230,172 after Katrina (July 2006)—a decrease of 254,502 and a loss of over half of the city's population. As of 2020, New Orleans had an estimated population of 383,997, still below the population of the city prior to Hurricane Katrina. However, not all those who moved to the city were returning residents. After Hurricane Katrina, the privatization push gained momentum. With the opportunity to enact proposals that had circulated since the mid-1980s, the city council voted unanimously to demolish 4,500 units of traditional public housing. In just over a decade—from 1996 to 2007—the city managed to close 85% of the city's public housing, adopting a system of "mixed-income" projects and vouchers instead. While liberals touted it as "deconcentration," the removal project effectively (and efficiently) displaced low-income residents from areas ripe for profit-making. As a result, 16,000 families remain on the waitlist for subsidized housing.

Pre-Katrina decrease in population
Prior to Hurricane Katrina, New Orleans experienced a decrease in population of 18% (109,000 residents) between 1970 and 2000, which fell by a further 6% (30,000 residents) from
2000 to 2005.

Diaspora destinations
In the initial period following Hurricane Katrina, there were several useful sources of data about where displaced residents from New Orleans were living. In particular, information on the location of refugees was available from change-of-address forms filed with the U.S. Postal Service and from registrations with the Federal Emergency Management Agency (FEMA) for aid. Analyses of these data showed that nearly 15% of evacuees from New Orleans relocated to distant cities in the East Coast, Midwest, and West Coast. The main destinations for displaced residents were suburban New Orleans, Houston, Dallas, Atlanta, and Baton Rouge.

Demographics
As of 2008, just over half of the city's adult residents (56 percent) were African American, roughly one in three (35 percent) were white, and 5 percent were Hispanic. This is roughly equivalent to the shape of the population in a 2006 survey, fielded one year after Katrina. It is also fairly similar to the city's pre-storm distribution, as measured by the Census Bureau's 2005 American Community Survey (ACS), which found that the adult population was 60 percent African American and 32 percent Caucasian.

Human rights
In the aftermath of the devastation caused by Hurricane Katrina, the issue of human rights was studied closely.  The UN Human Rights Committee issued a 2006 report recommending that the United States endeavor to make certain the rights of poor and black Americans "are fully taken into consideration in the reconstruction plans with regard to access to housing, education and health care".  The American Civil Liberties Union and the National Prison Project also documented mistreatment of the prison population during the flooding.  In 2008, the Institute for Southern Studies, a nonpartisan research center, published a report on "Hurricane Katrina and the Guiding Principles on Internal Displacement".  The study was one of five published by the ISS on the consequences of Hurricane Katrina and was a collaborative work produced along with the Brookings-Bern Project on Internal Displacement, co-directed by Walter Kälin, the Representative of the UN Secretary-General on the Human Rights of Internally Displaced Persons.  The report found that the U.S. government neglected to adhere to "internationally recognized human rights principles the Bush administration has promoted in other countries." From May to June 2008, United Nations Special Rapporteur Doudou Diène was invited by the U.S. government to visit and study racial discrimination in the U.S.  Diène's 2008 report was delivered to the United Nations Human Rights Council and was published in 2009.

Housing
Housing, particularly for the poor, has been a contentious issue.  In 2002, the United States Department of Housing and Urban Development (HUD) took over the Housing Authority of New Orleans (HANO) and planned shortly thereafter to redevelop half of the city's public housing complexes, which plan was instituted with urgency after Katrina struck the city.  The plan has been met with controversy, with protests after the government decided to replace 4,500 units of housing with a mixed-use development that has 744 public housing units in C.J. Peete, B.W. Cooper, Lafitte and St. Bernard public housing projects.

In May 2009, FEMA announced an end to its temporary housing program that it started in the aftermath of Katrina, but presented with the more than 3,400 people still living in FEMA trailers in Louisiana and Mississippi who faced eviction, offered hurricane victims on the Gulf Coast still living in government-supplied trailers to buy their temporary homes for as little as $1.

In the meantime, rent has spiked an average of 40% since the storm in the city, with the small rental program instituted after the disaster having been ineffective in assisting small holding landlords to rebuild and improve properties previously inhabited by renters.

Population recovery
Based on a 2009 study from the Brookings Institution in 2008, the city's population grew 3% from 2007 to 2008, compared with a 19% increase from 2006 to 2007, and overall, the city stood at about 72% of its pre-Katrina population of 450,000, or about 316,000, with the population of Jefferson Parish essentially returning to the pre-disaster level, and the adjoining St. Bernard Parish, reaching approximately 40% of its pre-disaster population.

Overall population continued to rebound by 2017, though more slowly, only increasing by 271 per year.  Meanwhile, neighbourhood populations continued to grow and shrink, based on local factors.  Data Center Research commented in 2018:

See also
Emergency evacuation
Internally displaced person
Kampala Convention
Refugee
Political asylee

References

External links
 Greater New Orleans Community Data Center information and data on reconstruction and repopulation

Effects of Hurricane Katrina
Forced migrations in the United States
Internally displaced persons
Internal migrations in the United States